The M Countdown Chart is a record chart on the South Korean Mnet television music program M Countdown. Every week, the show awards the best-performing single on the chart in the country during its live broadcast.

In 2011, 29 singles ranked number one on the chart and 24 music acts were awarded first-place trophies. Seven songs collected trophies for three weeks and achieved a triple crown: "Tonight" by Big Bang, "Intuition" by CNBLUE, "Pinocchio (Danger)" by f(x), "Fiction" by Beast, "Mr. Simple" by Super Junior, "The Boys" by Girls' Generation, and "Trouble Maker" by Trouble Maker. No release for the year earned a perfect score, but "Intuition" by CNBLUE acquired the highest point total on the April 7 broadcast with a score of 9,654.

Chart history

References 

2011 in South Korean music
2011 record charts
Lists of number-one songs in South Korea